Philipp Grubauer (born 25 November 1991) is a German professional ice hockey goaltender for the Seattle Kraken of the National Hockey League (NHL).

He was drafted by the Washington Capitals in the fourth round, 112th overall, of the 2010 NHL Entry Draft. Grubauer has played with the German national team in several international tournaments, including the 2008 U18 World Championships and the 2009 World Junior Championships. Grubauer won the Memorial Cup with the Ontario Hockey League (OHL)'s Windsor Spitfires in 2010. Grubauer won the Stanley Cup as a member of the Capitals in 2018.

In April 2015, while playing for the Capitals, Grubauer became the first German-born goaltender to start and win a Stanley Cup playoffs game. He is also the first Seattle Kraken goaltender to record a shutout, doing so in February 2022.

Playing career

Early career
Grubauer began his career in Germany, playing for the junior (U18) team of his hometown Starbulls Rosenheim beginning in 2006 at the age of 15. The following season, 2007–08, Grubauer played 23 games for the Starbulls U18 team, as well as five games with the senior club. Following the 2007–08 season, Grubauer moved to North America to play with the Belleville Bulls of the Ontario Hockey League (OHL) after being selected 25th overall in the 2008 CHL Import Draft.

Grubauer served as the Bulls' back-up goaltender in the 2008–09, but became the team's starter in 2009–10. That season, he played in 31 games for the Bulls before being traded in January 2010 to the Windsor Spitfires in a seven-player deal. The Spitfires won the Memorial Cup for the second consecutive year that May, and Grubauer led all goaltenders in the tournament with a .930 save percentage and a 2.14 goals against average (GAA).

On 26 June 2010, Grubauer was selected in the fourth round, 112th overall, by the Washington Capitals in the 2010 NHL Entry Draft.

Just a few days after the NHL Draft, Grubauer, along with Windsor's first-round 2010 CHL Import Draft pick, was traded to the Kingston Frontenacs in exchange for Nick Czinder, A. J. Jarosz, Kingston's first-round pick in the 2010 CHL Import Draft and Kingston's second- and seventh-round (conditional) picks in the 2011 OHL Priority Draft.

Grubauer signed a three-year, entry-level contract with the Capitals on 4 October 2010, as his season with the Frontenacs began.

Grubauer played 38 games for the Frontenacs before falling ill with mononucleosis in February. He returned to Germany to recuperate and missed the rest of the season, his final age-eligible season in the OHL.

Professional

Washington Capitals
Grubauer returned to the ice for the first time since his bout with mononucleosis at the Capitals' 2011–12 season development camp. He reported that he had lost 20 pounds while ill. Following training camp in September, Grubauer was eventually assigned to the South Carolina Stingrays of the ECHL, a minor league affiliate of the Capitals. Grubauer was recalled to the American Hockey League (AHL)'s Hershey Bears on 12 October 2011, but did not play any games and returned to the Stingrays on 23 October. On 8 November 2011, the ECHL announced that Grubauer had been named the Reebok Hockey ECHL Goaltender of the Week for the week of 31 October to 6 November. Grubauer was 3–0–0 with one shutout, a 1.00 GAA and a .960 save percentage during that span. Grubauer was named the ECHL's Goaltender of the Month for November. In eight games with the Stingrays in November, he went 6–1–1 with one shutout, a 1.73 GAA and a .935 save percentage. Grubauer was named ECHL Rookie of the Month in January and at the conclusion of the season, was named to the ECHL All-Rookie Team for 2011–12.
 
In the 2012–13 season, the Washington Capitals' ECHL affiliation became the Reading Royals, and Grubauer split the season between Reading and Hershey, moving up to Hershey when the NHL ended their labour lockout and when goaltender Braden Holtby was promoted to Washington full-time for the 2012–13 season. Grubauer made his NHL debut in relief of Braden Holtby in a 4–1 loss to the Philadelphia Flyers on 27 February 2013, stopping all 14 shots faced in just over 25 minutes of play. Grubauer then made his first NHL start on 9 March 2013, in a 5–2 loss to the New York Islanders. He faced 45 shots in the game, stopping 40.

On 6 July 2017, the Capitals re-signed Grubauer to a one-year, $1.5 million contract. During the 2017–18 season, Grubauer recorded a career-high 15 wins in 28 starts. Grubauer was the Capitals' starter to begin the 2018 Stanley Cup playoffs after a strong (7–3–0) record in 10 of the final 16 games in the Capitals' regular season. Grubauer made 23 saves in a 4–3 overtime loss in Game One against the Columbus Blue Jackets. However, Holtby permanently took over the goaltending duties from Grubauer after replacing him during Game 2 of the series. The Capitals ended up winning the Stanley Cup after defeating the Vegas Golden Knights in five games.

Colorado Avalanche
On 22 June 2018, Grubauer and Brooks Orpik were traded to the Colorado Avalanche in exchange for a 2018 second-round pick during the 2018 NHL Entry Draft. The following day, the Avalanche re-signed Grubauer to a three-year, $10 million contract extension.

He recorded an 18–9–5 record during the regular season, but a second-half surge led Grubauer to be named Colorado's starting goaltender for the 2019 Stanley Cup playoffs. He helped lead the Avalanche to a first-round upset over the first-place Calgary Flames, but lost in Round 2 to the San Jose Sharks in seven games. Grubauer recorded a 7–5 record with a 2.30 goals against average during the playoffs.

During the 2019 off-season, goaltender Semyon Varlamov signed a free-agent deal with the New York Islanders, cementing Grubauer's place as Colorado's starter. However injuries would again hamper his 2019–20 season and ended up splitting time with Pavel Francouz. He made 36 starts in the regular season and went 5–1 with a 1.87 goals against average in seven playoffs starts before suffering an injury in the Second Round.

Grubauer bounced back from his playoffs injury and had the best season of his career during the shortened 2020–21 NHL season. With accomplished backup Pavel Francouz injured the entire season, Grubauer had a heavy workload and started 39 of 56 contests. He finished the regular season with a record of 30–9–1, a goals against average of 1.95, a save percentage of .922, and 7 shutouts despite missing two weeks in April with a COVID-19 diagnosis. His win total was second only to Andrei Vasilevskiy (31) and his goals against average was second only to Alex Nedeljkovic (1.90), who played in 17 fewer games than Grubauer. Grubauer's save percentage was good for ninth on the season and he tied for the league lead in shutouts with Semyon Varlamov. On 10 May 2021, with his team needing a regulation win in order to prevent the Vegas Golden Knights from winning both the division and the Presidents' Trophy, Grubauer stopped 36 of 37 shots in a 2–1 victory. The Avalanche would go on to win their division and the Presidents Trophy for the third time in franchise history three days later after defeating the Los Angeles Kings 5–1 at Ball Arena in the 56th and final game of the regular season. On 1 June 2021, Grubauer was named a Vezina finalist for the first time in his career along with Marc-André Fleury and Andrei Vasilevskiy. 

Grubauer continued his stellar play in the 2021 Stanley Cup playoffs as the Avalanche swept the St. Louis Blues in the West Division First Round and took the first two games of the West Division Second Round series from the Golden Knights. After defeating the Knights 3–2 in overtime in the second game and making a postseason career-high 39 saves, Grubauer became only the 10th goaltender in NHL history to record 10 or more consecutive victories in the postseason, joining elite company. He also broke famed Avalanche goaltender Patrick Roy's longstanding franchise record for a postseason win streak by attaining his sixth straight win. Roy had previously held the record with five straight wins which he set three separate times.

Seattle Kraken
On 28 July 2021, as a free agent and unable to come to terms with the Avalanche, Grubauer opted to sign a six-year, $35.4 million contract to join the expansion club Seattle Kraken. He became the first Seattle Kraken goaltender to record a shutout on 2 February 2022, defeating the New York Islanders 3–0.

International play
Grubauer has appeared in several international competitions, representing Germany. He participated in the 2008 World U-17 Hockey Challenge, where Germany placed ninth in the tournament; Grubauer was named to the tournament's All-Star team after posting a .909 save percentage and 3.49 GAA.

Three months following the 2008 U-17 Hockey Challenge, Grubauer, sharing goaltending duties with Felix Brückmann, played in the 2008 IIHF World U18 Championships, held in Kazan, Russia. Germany placed fifth in the tournament, and Grubauer was selected as Germany's Player of the Game in Germany's 9–2 loss to Canada on the first day of round robin play.

At the age of 17, Grubauer participated in the 2009 World Junior Championships in Ottawa, Ontario. However, Germany won just one game in the tournament, and following a ninth-place finish, were relegated to Division I for the 2010 World Junior Championships.

Grubauer gained attention while competing for Germany in Division I of the 2010 World Junior Championships in Megève and Saint-Gervais-les-Bains, France. Germany placed first in their group, winning all five of their games in order to put them back in the Top Division for the 2011 World Junior Championships. Germany's success was largely due to the play of Grubauer, who posted a 0.64 GAA and a .974 save percentage in five games.

Grubauer then participated in the 2011 World Junior Championships in Buffalo and Lewiston, New York, but Germany performed similarly to the 2009 World Junior Championships and finished tenth, sending them back to Division I for 2012. Grubauer recorded losses for all four games he started in the tournament.

Career statistics

Regular season and playoffs

International

Awards and honours

References

External links
 

1991 births
Living people
Belleville Bulls players
Colorado Avalanche players
German expatriates in the United States
German ice hockey goaltenders
Hershey Bears players
Kingston Frontenacs players
People from Rosenheim
Sportspeople from Upper Bavaria
Reading Royals players
Seattle Kraken players
South Carolina Stingrays players
Stanley Cup champions
Starbulls Rosenheim players
Washington Capitals draft picks
Washington Capitals players
Windsor Spitfires players